Kasian-e Rostam Khani (also Romanized as Kāsīān-e Rostam Khānī; also known as Rostam Khānī and Rostam Khānī-ye Kaseyān) is a village in Beyranvand-e Jonubi Rural District, Bayravand District, Khorramabad County, Lorestan Province, Iran. At the 2006 census, its population was 455, in 99 families.

References 

Towns and villages in Khorramabad County